Hans Kurath (13 December 1891 – 2 January 1992) was an American linguist of Austrian origin. He was full professor for English and Linguistics at the University of Michigan, Ann Arbor. The many varieties of regional English that he encountered during his trips convinced him of the necessity of completing a systematic study of American English.

In 1926, he convinced the Modern Language Association to begin planning for the project, and in 1931, a pilot study of the New England region was initiated under his direction, eventually producing the Linguistic Atlas of New England. It soon became clear, however, that the undertaking was too complex to be completed by a single team of linguists. The project was thus expanded to eight additional regional operations.

Kurath guided the vision and goals of the regional projects for three decades and oversaw the publication of a series of volumes that are known collectively as the Linguistic Atlas of the United States, the first linguistic atlas of the US. For that work, he received the Loubat Prize.

He was also the first main editor of the Middle English Dictionary. Together with Raven I. McDavid, Jr., he also published a linguistic atlas of the Eastern United States, The Pronunciation of English in the Atlantic States.

Life
Kurath was born in Villach, Austria-Hungary. He emigrated to the US in 1907 and became a US citizen in 1912. He studied at the Universities of Texas and Chicago. He did his Ph.D. in 1920. Afterwards, he became professor in German at Northwestern University (1920–1927) and then professor for German and Linguistics at the Ohio State University (1927–1931) and Brown University (1931–1946).

In 1946, he became Full Professor for English and Linguistics at the University of Michigan, Ann Arbor (1946–1962). In 1941, he was president of the Linguistic Society of America. In 1959, he received an honorary doctorate from the University of Chicago.

He died in Ann Arbor, Michigan, at the age of 100. His wife was the dance ethnologist Gertrude Prokosch Kurath.

Methodology
Kurath's chief research interest was historical linguistics and his primary goal was to use the Linguistic Atlas to reconstruct the evolution of American English from the relatively "pure" forms of English brought to the United States by the early settlers to the regional dialects that existed in the contemporary United States. Kurath was convinced that language held a living record of events like the growth of trade and transport systems, urbanization, and population movements. By plotting regional differences in vocabulary and pronunciation on maps, Kurath and other researchers assembled what they hoped was a visual record of the social processes that had transformed American English over the past 200 years.

Each regional operation used similar techniques: a small team of linguists fanned out across the region interviewing at least two people in every county. Kurath gave the researchers explicit instructions about the types of informants who were considered appropriate for the project. In every town or city selected for the project, at least two people would be chosen, one had to be "old-fashioned and unschooled," Kurath suggested a farmer or a farmer's wife, and the other should be "a member of the middle class who has had the benefit of a grade-school or high-school education" (Kurath 1949: v). The communities themselves were also carefully screened. Kurath placed a priority on towns that were early American settlements or could be directly linked to them through historical records.

Selected bibliography 
Linguistic Atlas of New England, 3 vols., New York 1939–1943
Handbook of the Linguistic Geography of New England, Providence 1939
A Word Geography of the Eastern United States, Ann Arbor 1949
Middle English Dictionary (main editor), Ann Arbor 1946-1962
The Pronunciation of English in the Atlantic States (with Raven I. McDavid, Jr.), Ann Arbor 1961

Sources
Bailey, Richard W. (1992), "Hans Kurath", Language 68: 797-808.
 Brown, Nina: "Hans Kurath: Linguistic Atlas of the United States", Center for Spatially Integrated Social Science.
Encyclopædia Britannica, s.v. Hans Kurath
Schneider, Edgar (1992): "In memoriam Hans Kurath". English World-Wide 13: 111 – 113.
Stammerjohann, Harro et al. (eds.) (1996), Lexicon grammaticorum: Who's Who in the History of World Linguistics, Tübingen: Niemeyer, s.v. Kurath, Hans.

External links
 Picture
 
 Linguistic Atlas Projects 
 University of Pennsylvania Department of Linguistic
 American Dialect Society

1891 births
1992 deaths
Linguists from the United States
American centenarians
Men centenarians
American lexicographers
Sociolinguists
University of Michigan faculty
Austro-Hungarian emigrants to the United States
University of Texas at Austin alumni
Linguistic Society of America presidents
20th-century linguists
Brown University faculty
20th-century lexicographers